The Lamp of Destiny is a 1919 British silent drama film, directed by Alexander Butler and starring Judd Green, Daphne Glenne and Florence Nelson.

Cast
 Judd Green
 Leal Douglas
 Daphne Glenne
 Florence Nelson

References

External links

1919 films
1919 drama films
British silent feature films
British drama films
Films directed by Alexander Butler
Films set in England
British black-and-white films
1910s English-language films
1910s British films
Silent drama films